Israel competed at the 1999 World Championships in Athletics from 20 August and 29 August in Seville, Spain.

Medalists 
The following competitors from Israel won medals at the Championships.

Men's pole vault

Qualification

Final

Men's 100 meters

Heats

Quarterfinals

Men's 200 meters

Heats

Men's 4 × 100 metres relay

Heats

Women's 100 metres hurdles

Heats

Women's 400 metres hurdles

Heats

Men's marathon

Men's triple jump

Qualification

References

1999
Nations at the 1999 World Championships in Athletics
World Championships in Athletics